This is a list of remarkable overhead powerline spans within New Zealand.

See also
 List of power stations in New Zealand

References

Powerline river crossings
Spans
Spans